Joseph "Dandy" Don Meredith (April 10, 1938 – December 5, 2010) was an American football quarterback, sports commentator, and actor. He spent all nine seasons of his professional playing career (1960–1968) with the Dallas Cowboys of the National Football League (NFL). He was named to the Pro Bowl in each of his last three years as a player. He subsequently became a color analyst for NFL telecasts from 1970 to 1984. As an original member of the Monday Night Football broadcast team, he famously played the role of Howard Cosell's comic foil. Meredith was also an actor who appeared in a dozen films and seven major television shows, some of which had him as the main starring actor. He is probably familiar to television audiences as Bert Jameson, a recurring role he had in Police Story.

Early years
Meredith was born on April 10, 1938, in Mount Vernon, Texas, located about 100 miles east of Dallas. He attended Mount Vernon High School in his hometown, where he starred in football and basketball, performed in school plays, and graduated second in his class.

College career
Although he was heavily recruited by Texas A&M head coach Bear Bryant, Meredith played college football at Southern Methodist University (SMU) in Dallas. His reasoning, likely intended to be more humorous than real, was due to its being closer to home, and the acronym being easier to spell. He led the Southwest Conference (SWC) in passing completion percentage in each of his three years as the starting quarterback (1957–59), and was an All-America selection in 1958 and 1959. His fellow students jokingly referred to the school as "Southern Meredith University" due to his popularity on campus. He completed 8 of 20 passes for 156 yards in the College All-Stars' 32–7 loss to the defending NFL champion Baltimore Colts in Chicago on August 12, 1960.

Meredith was honored twice by SMU in later decades; he was the recipient of the university's Distinguished Alumni Award in 1983, and his jersey number 17 was retired during halftime ceremonies at the SMU–Houston game on October 18, 2008. He was also inducted into the College Football Hall of Fame in 1982.

Professional career
The Dallas Cowboys franchise was admitted to the league too late to participate in the 1960 NFL Draft, so on November 28, 1959, two days before the draft, Meredith signed a five-year personal services contract with Tecon Corporation, which like the Cowboys, was owned by Clint Murchison. He was intending to attend law school before the deal. This contract meant he would play for the Cowboys if and when they received an NFL franchise. He was also selected by the Chicago Bears in the third round (32nd overall) of the 1960 NFL Draft, after Bears owner George Halas made the pick to help ensure that the expansion Cowboys got off to a solid start. The league honored the contract, but made the Cowboys compensate the Bears with a third-round pick in the 1962 NFL Draft. He is considered by some to be the original Dallas Cowboy because he had come to the team even before the franchise had adopted a nickname, hired a head coach (Tom Landry) or scout (Gil Brandt), or participated in either the 1960 NFL Expansion Draft or its first NFL Draft in 1961. The Texans, their crosstown rivals in the American Football League, also chose him as a "territorial selection" in their 1960 draft, but were too late to sign him.

Meredith spent two years as a backup to Eddie LeBaron, eventually splitting time in 1962 before he was given the full-time starting job by head coach Tom Landry in 1963. In 1966, Meredith led the Cowboys to the NFL postseason, something he continued to do until his unexpected retirement before the 1969 season. His two most heartbreaking defeats came in NFL Championship play against the Green Bay Packers, 34–27 in Dallas (1966), during which he was intercepted on a 4th-down passing play, an interception that he later claimed was due to a coaching issue, having incorrect personnel and formation on the field; and the famous "Ice Bowl" game, 21–17 in Green Bay (1967). Already feeling physically and mentally fatigued as a leader, he had his worst playoff outing in 1968 against the Cleveland Browns in the Eastern Conference Championship game, throwing three interceptions before being benched, which led to his retirement in 1969 at age 31. His successor Craig Morton also struggled to win a championship until ultimately Roger Staubach proved to be the missing ingredient needed to finally help the 1971 Cowboys win their first Super Bowl.

Meredith, while never leading the Cowboys to a Super Bowl, was always exceptionally popular with Cowboys fans, who remember him for his grit and toughness, his outgoing nature, and his leadership during the first winning seasons for the Cowboys. During his career, he had a 50.7% completion rate, throwing for 17,199 yards and 135 touchdowns with a lifetime passer rating of 74.8. He was named the NFL Player of the Year in 1966 and was named to the Pro Bowl three times. According to the NFL, the longest pass with no yards after catch  was his 83-yard pass to Bob Hayes.  However, the NFL does not keep statistics on the distance of actual passes.

NFL career statistics

Postfootball career

Following his football career, Meredith became a color commentator for Monday Night Football beginning in 1970. He left for three seasons (1974–1976) to work with Curt Gowdy at NFL on NBC, then returned to MNF partners Frank Gifford and Howard Cosell. His approach to color commentary was light-hearted and folksy in contrast to Cosell's observations and Gifford's play-by-play technique. He was known for singing "Turn out the lights, the party's over" (a line from a Willie Nelson song "The Party's Over") at garbage time.

Meredith's broadcasting career was also not without a few incidents of minor controversy, including referring to then-President Richard Nixon as "Tricky Dick", announcing that he was "mile-high" before a game in Denver, and turning the name of Cleveland Browns receiver Fair Hooker into a double entendre (saying "Fair Hooker...well, I haven't met one yet!"). He retired from sportscasting after the 1984 season, a year after Cosell's retirement. His final broadcast was Super Bowl XIX with Frank Gifford and Joe Theismann, which was the first Super Bowl broadcast by ABC. He moved to Santa Fe, New Mexico, where he lived in seclusion as a painter until his passing.

In 1976, Meredith was inducted into the Dallas Cowboys Ring of Honor at Texas Stadium with former running back Don Perkins.

The novel North Dallas Forty, written by former Dallas Cowboy wide receiver and Meredith teammate Peter Gent, is a fictional account of life in the NFL during the 1960s, featuring quarterback Seth Maxwell, a character widely believed to be based on Meredith, and receiver Phil Elliot, believed to be based on Gent. Maxwell and Elliot are characterized as boozing, womanizing, aging stars in the twilight of their careers, held together by pills and alcohol. Of the story, Meredith said, "If I'd known Gent was as good as he says he was, I would have thrown to him more."

Meredith was selected as the 2007 recipient of the Pro Football Hall of Fame's Pete Rozelle Radio-Television Award. He received the award at the Enshrinee's Dinner on August 3, 2007.

Acting career
Meredith also had an acting career, appearing in multiple movies and television shows. From the mid-1970s through the early '80s, he was in a series of commercials for Lipton Tea. He voiced himself in an episode of King of the Hill
("A Beer Can Named Desire"), in which he misses a throw that would have won the main character, Hank Hill, $100,000. He was also part of an ensemble cast in his son Michael Meredith's Three Days of Rain with Blythe Danner, Peter Falk, and Jason Patric.

One of his early film roles was as Kelly Freeman in the 1974 film Terror on the 40th Floor, which starred John Forsythe, Joseph Campanella, and Lynn Carlin.

One of his recurring starring roles was as Detective Bert Jameson in Police Story. Tony Lo Bianco also had an ongoing role as Det. Calabrese in the same lot of episodes as Meredith. They also appeared as their characters separately in later episodes. One episode, "The Witness", features a picture of Meredith in his Dallas uniform hanging on a wall in Delaney's bar, while Bert interviews witnesses to a robbery below his picture.

Family
Meredith was married three times. His first wife was former SMU cheerleader Lynne Shamburger; they were married from 1959 to 1963 and had one daughter, Mary. From 1965 to 1971, he was married to the former Cheryl King, with whom he had son Michael and daughter Heather. He met his third wife, the former Susan Lessons Dullea (ex-wife of actor Keir Dullea), as they were both walking on Third Avenue in New York City. They married in 1972.

Death
Meredith died on December 5, 2010, at St. Vincent Regional Medical Center in Santa Fe, New Mexico, after suffering a brain hemorrhage. He was 72 years old. He was laid to rest in his hometown of Mount Vernon, Texas.

Filmography

See also
 Most consecutive games with at least two touchdown passes

References

External links

 
 
 

1938 births
2010 deaths
American football quarterbacks
College football announcers
Dallas Cowboys players
Eastern Conference Pro Bowl players
National Football League announcers
People from Mount Vernon, Texas
Pete Rozelle Radio-Television Award recipients
Players of American football from Texas
SMU Mustangs football players
Sports Emmy Award winners